Nueva Italia (Spanish for New Italy) is a town in the Central Department of Paraguay.

History

Nueva Italia was created in 1904 by the Paraguay government in order to establish some colonists from Italy and their 18 families in a farming area 40 km south of the capital Asunción. In addition to Italians, a community of German and Ukrainian emigrants also moved to Nueva Italia. 

 
The first manager-administrator of this Colonia Nueva Italia (as was officially named) was the Italian count Enrico Statella. After WW1 many Italians returned to Italy or moved to the capital Asuncion, but the settlement -after an initial crisis- survived & remained as a small agricultural center. Mura, Musto and Carolini were some of the Italian families that remained and perfectly integrated with the local Paraguayan population.
 
In the 1930s the colony was a success and grew in importance as a farming city for the Greater Asunción area
 
In 1956 was created the Distrito Nueva Italia, that in the 2010s have nearly 20,000 inhabitants.
 
The main activities are farming and husbandry. Recently is being developed some tourism, thanks to new roads toward the capital and other surroundings
 
The city is located to the north of the "Distrito Nueva Italia" and has a perfect square shape, because of the original urban planning promoted by count Enrico Statella.

The District "Nueva Italia"

The "Central department" of Paraguay (with the "Greater Asuncion" metropolitan area) is divided in 19 districts. The one located in the most southern section is Nueva Italia:

Notable people 
José Cardozo, football player.

See also 
Italians in Paraguay
Italian diaspora

Notes

Sources 
 Ministero Affari Esteri. Emigrazione e colonie. Volume 3 of Emigrazione e colonie: Raccolta di rapporti dei RR. agenti diplomatici e consolari, Italy. Commissariato generale dell'emigrazione. Tipografia nazionale di G. Bertero. Roma, 1908
World Gazeteer: Paraguay – World-Gazetteer.com

Populated places in the Central Department
Italian diaspora in South America